Flag flying days in Finland are days of the year when the national flag is flown nationwide, either by law or by custom. The flag of Finland is generally flown only on special occasions to celebrate or honour someone or something. On certain days of the year the state officially flies the flag, and recommends all private citizens to do so as well, these are the flag flying days as listed below. Any citizen has a right to fly the flag on their own property if they deem it appropriate, for example in celebration of birthdays or weddings in the family. Midsummer's day is additionally celebrated as Flag Day in Finland.

Legal enforcement 

By law, the Finnish flag must be flown from public buildings on the following days. It is recommended  that private citizens to also fly the flag on these days.

Customary flag days 

It has become customary to fly the Finnish flag on the following occasions. These dates are also listed in the Finnish State Calendar compiled by the University of Helsinki, and it is recommended that the flag is flown on these occasions.

See also 

 Holidays in Finland
 National anthem of Finland
 Finnish national symbols
 Household pennant of Finland
 Flag Day (a list of Flag Days in various countries)
Flag flying days in Norway
Flag flying days in Sweden

References

Finnish culture
Society of Finland
Lists of observances
 
Finland